The 15th Legislative Assembly of Puerto Rico met from January 2, 2005, to January 1, 2009. All members of the House of Representatives and the Senate were elected in the General Elections of 2004. The House and the Senate both had a majority of members from the New Progressive Party. It was the second time in Puerto Rican history in which the majority of the Assembly was from a different party than of the Governor of Puerto Rico.

Meetings were held regarding the political status of Puerto Rico.

Major legislation
 Tax Justice Act (Ley de Justicia Contributiva), also known as the Puerto Rico tax reform.
 Government Fiscal Reform Act (Ley de Reforma Fiscal Gubernamental)

Senate leadership

House leadership

Members

Members of the 15th Legislative Assembly as of June 2005:

Senate

There are 17 NPP, 9 PDP, and 1 PIP in the higher chamber of the 15th Legislative Assembly

House of Representatives (incomplete)

Changes in membership

Senate

Changes in leadership

 June 6, 2005: Margarita Nolasco substitutes Jorge de Castro Font as Majority Leader of the Senate.  De Castro retains most powers as Rules Committee Chair.
 June 6, 2005: Carlos Pagán substitutes Margarita Nolasco as Majority Whip of the Senate.
 March 11, 2008: Jorge de Castro Font substitutes Margarita Nolasco as Majority Leader of the Senate.
 March 11, 2008: Margarita Nolasco replaces Carlos Pagán as Majority Whip of the Senate.
 August 24, 2008: Jorge de Castro Font announces he is stepping down as Majority Leader after his office and apartment are searched by the FBI the day before.
 August 27, 2008: Senate President Kenneth McClintock recognizes Margarita Nolasco as Majority Leader of the Senate.
 September, 2008, Carlos Pagán replaces Margarita Nolasco as Majority Whip

Notes
This is not the first time that the majority of the Legislature has been of a party different from the governor. In 1969–1972, the NPP controlled the House, the PDP controlled the Senate and the Governor was the late Luis A. Ferré (NPP). Between 1981 and 1984 the Governor was Carlos Romero Barceló (NPP) and the Senate from 1981 to 1984, and the House from 1982 to 1984, were controlled by the PDP.

References

External links
The Office of Legislative Services / Oficina de Servicios Legislativos 
The Office of Legislative Services / Oficina de Servicios Legislativos

Legislative Assembly of Puerto Rico by session